Colleen Ferrick is a former New Zealand international lawn bowler.

Bowls career
Ferrick won two medals at the 1993 Asia Pacific Bowls Championships in the 1993 triples and fours.

She won a bronze medal in the Women's fours at the 1994 Commonwealth Games in Victoria with Adrienne Lambert, Ann Muir and Marlene Castle.

She joined the Heretaunga Ladies Bowling Club in 1979 and later became the President at Heretaunga and Hawke's Bay. She has won one national title and 42 senior club titles.

References

Living people
1942 births
Bowls players at the 1994 Commonwealth Games
Commonwealth Games bronze medallists for New Zealand
Commonwealth Games medallists in lawn bowls
New Zealand female bowls players
Medallists at the 1994 Commonwealth Games